Her Own Way is a lost 1915 silent film drama directed by Herbert Blaché and starring Florence Reed. It is based on a 1903 Broadway play by Clyde Fitch that was a starring vehicle for Maxine Elliott.

Cast
Florence Reed - Georgiana Carley
Blanche Davenport - Mr. Carley
Clarissa Selwynne - Mrs. Steven Carley
Robert Barrat - Lt. Richard Coleman
Fraunie Fraunholz - Steven Carley
William A. Morse - Sam 
John Karney - Moles
James O'Neill - Grand Duke Vladimir

References

External links

1915 films
American silent feature films
Lost American films
Films directed by Herbert Blaché
American films based on plays
1915 drama films
American black-and-white films
Silent American drama films
Metro Pictures films
1915 lost films
Lost drama films
1910s American films